Sarem Hospital is a private general hospital with a focus on gynecology and infertility. It is located in Ekbatan Town in the west of Tehran, Iran. The current CEO of the hospital is AboTaleb Saremi and its chief operating officer is Saeed Dehkhodaei.

History
The process of construction of the Sarem Hospital started in 1998 under the supervision of AboTaleb Saremi and the hospital officially began its services in 2006.

Publications
Sarem Journal of Reproductive Medicine is published by the Sarem Cell Research Center (SCRC) and Sarem Fertility Research Center (SAFIR).
Mashgh-e Tandorosti (Homework of Health) is published by the hospital for a general audience.
Sarem also publishes an internal newspaper and a monthly journal.

References

External links
 
 Teheran hospitals

Hospital buildings completed in 2006
Private hospitals in Iran
Hospitals established in 2006
Buildings and structures in Tehran